Jalas is a Finnish surname. Notable people with the surname include:

 Jaakko Jalas (1920–1999), Finnish botanist
 Jalas, systematist citation of this person
 Jussi Jalas (1908–1985), Finnish conductor and composer

Finnish-language surnames